Vestre Innlandet District Court is a district court located in Innlandet county, Norway. This court is based at four different courthouses which are located in Gjøvik, Fagernes, Lillehammer, and Vågåmo. The court serves the western part of the county which includes cases from 24 municipalities. The court in Gjøvik accepts cases from the municipalities of Gjøvik, Gran, Nordre Land, Søndre Land, Vestre Toten, and Vestre Toten. The court in Lillehammer accepts cases from the municipalities of Gausdal, Lillehammer, Ringebu, Sør-Fron, and Øyer. The court in Fagernes accepts cases from the municipalities of Etnedal, Nord-Aurdal, Sør-Aurdal, Vestre Slidre, Vang, and Øystre Slidre. The court in Vågåmo accepts cases from the municipalities of Dovre, Lesja, Lom, Nord-Fron, Sel, Skjåk, and Vågå. The court is subordinate to the Eidsivating Court of Appeal.

The court is led by a chief judge and several other judges. The court is a court of first instance.  Its judicial duties are mainly to settle criminal cases and to resolve civil litigation as well as bankruptcy. The administration and registration tasks of the court include death registration, issuing certain certificates, performing duties of a notary public, and officiating civil wedding ceremonies.  Cases from this court are heard by a combination of professional judges and lay judges.  Cases from this district court may be appealed to the Eidsivating Court of Appeal.

History
This court was established on 26 April 2021 after the old Gjøvik District Court, Nord-Gudbrandsdal District Court, Sør-Gudbrandsdal District Court, and Valdres District Court were all merged into one court. At the same time, Lunner municipality, which was previously under the Gjøvik District Court, was transferred to the newly established Ringerike, Asker og Bærum District Court. The new district court system continues to use the courthouses from the predecessor courts.

References

District courts of Norway
2021 establishments in Norway
Organisations based in Lillehammer
Organisations based in Fagernes
Organisations based in Gjøvik
Organisations based in Vågå